The Association Paris Saint-Germain Football, Association loi 1901, commonly known as Association Paris Saint-Germain, or simply Association PSG, is a nonprofit organization based in Île-de-France (Paris Region), France. Founded in 1970, the Association manages the amateur section of French professional football clubs Paris Saint-Germain Football Club (men's team) and Paris Saint-Germain Féminine (women's team).

The club's amateur section includes the youngest high-level players of the Paris Saint-Germain Academy as well as the amateur teams who play in the Paris Region. Hence, almost all PSG footballers except the two professional teams (men and women) are under the supervision of the Association. It also handled the male squad before PSG became a professional sport limited company in 1991. The female side, for its part, broke away from the Association after assuming professional status in 2012.

Its headquarters are located at the Camp des Loges in Saint-Germain-en-Laye, which has been the training facility of the men's youth teams since 1975. The women's youth sides train at the Centre Sports et Loisirs de la Banque de France de Bougival (CSLBF de Bougival) in Bougival. All PSG Academy 
and amateur teams play their home matches at the Stade Municipal Georges Lefèvre, a sports complex located just across the street from the Camp des Loges.

History

On June 17, 1970, Paris Football Club and Stade Saint-Germain merged to form Paris Saint-Germain Football Club. It was made official on August 12, 1970, with the creation of the Association Paris Saint-Germain Football, Association loi 1901. This organization managed the club's amateur and professional activities for two decades. It all changed when PSG were bought by Canal+ in May 1991 before the 1991–92 season. They created the Société Anonyme Sportive Professionnelle Paris Saint-Germain Football Club.

The Association and the club (SASP, i.e., professional sport limited company) were now two separate entities, each one with a different president. So, they reached an agreement in which the Association transferred the professional section to the SASP, while keeping control over the management of the amateur section. As part of the deal, the Association also granted its French Football Federation affiliation number to the SASP, but they are still in charge of registering the club's professional football teams in official competitions such as Ligue 1, Coupe de France, Trophée des Champions, UEFA Champions League and FIFA Club World Cup. Both organizations signed a new 10-year agreement in 2019.

Between 1970 and 2012, the club's professional section only consisted of the men's team. Formed in 1971, the women's side, Paris Saint-Germain Féminine, initially had amateur status and were run by the Association. When the team turned professional in September 2012 ahead of the 2012–13 season, it detached from the Association and integrated the SASP. Today, the club's amateur section is now mainly composed of the Paris Saint-Germain Academy men's and women's teams, which are managed by the Association.

PSG have been subsequently sold to Colony Capital in 2006 and then to current owners Qatar Sports Investments (QSI) in 2011. QSI chairman Nasser Al-Khelaifi is the current president of the SASP. On the other hand, the Association has had nine presidents, including four since 1991. Pierre-Étienne Guyot, elected in 1970, was the Association and club's first president. For his part, Francis Borelli was the last to preside both the Association and club when they were the same entity. Bernard Brochand was the first president of the Association after it became an independent organization from the club (SASP) in 1991.

French financial analyst Benoît Rousseau is the Association's current president. He has been in charge since December 2012. Previous chairman, French lawyer Simon Tahar, was the last to preside both the youth academy and the women's teams; the latter professionalized in 2012. Tahar and Rousseau also served as interim club presidents for a few months in 2008 and 2011, respectively. Alain Cayzac occupied both positions as well. He was the Association's president between 2001 and 2006, and then club president from 2006 to 2008.

Mission and vision

The role of the Association Paris Saint-Germain is to promote the practice of amateur football among young girls and boys through the Paris Saint-Germain Academy, considered one of the best youth systems in France, but also among seniors, veterans and young adults in Île-de-France (Paris Region) through separate teams. Children recruited by the club join the academy and work their way up through the ranks, before breaking into the men's and women's professional squads or signing professional contracts with other clubs.

Each week confrontations with French and European clubs are organized by the Association. 35 teams, 45 managers and 500 to 750 players of all age groups are on the fields every weekend. The boys train at the Camp des Loges, the Association's headquarters in Saint-Germain-en-Laye, while the girls do so at the Centre Sports et Loisirs de la Banque de France de Bougival (CSLBF de Bougival) in Bougival. The academy (boys and girls) and amateur teams all play at the Stade Municipal Georges Lefèvre, located in front of the Camp des Loges.

Presidents

As of the 2019–20 season.

Organizational chart

As of the 2019–20 season.

References

External links

Official websites
Association Paris Saint-Germain
PSG.FR - Site officiel du Paris Saint-Germain

Association Paris Saint-Germain
Association Paris Saint-Germain
Association Paris Saint-Germain
Association Paris Saint-Germain